The Union for Democracy and Peace in Ivory Coast (UDPCI) is a political party in Ivory Coast, led by Toikeuse Mabri. In the 2011 parliamentary election, the party won 7 seats. In the 2016 parliamentary election, the party won 6 seats. The party tends to see more support among the Dan people.

References

Political parties in Ivory Coast